is a type of historic Japanese pottery found in the area of Taitō, Tokyo.

External links 
 http://bunka.nii.ac.jp/heritages/detail/233978
 http://www.city.taito.lg.jp/index/kurashi/gakushu/bunkazai/yuukeibunkazai/koukosiryou/iriyaisekisitayani.html

Culture in Tokyo
Japanese pottery
Taitō